ICCE may refer to:

 Councils on Chiropractic Education International
 Imperial College Computing Engine